The Applied Research Institute - Jerusalem (ARIJ) is a Palestinian NGO founded in 1990 with its main office in Bethlehem in the West Bank. ARIJ is actively working on research projects in the fields of management of natural resources, water management, sustainable agriculture and political dynamics of development in the Palestinian Territories.

Projects

POICA 
Together with the Land Research Center (LRC), ARIJ runs a joint project named POICA, Eye on Palestine–Monitoring Israeli Colonizing activities in the Palestinian Territories.  The project, funded by the European Union, inspects and scrutinizes Israeli colonizing activities in the West Bank and Gaza, and disseminates the related information to policy makers in the European countries and to the general public.

Sustainable waste treatment 
In 2011 ARIJ, along with the TTZ Bremerhaven, the University of Extremadura, and the Institute on Membrane Technology of the Italian National Research Council (CNR-ITM) started a project with the title of "Sustainable Treatment and Valorization of Olive Mill Waste in Palestine".
The project is funded by the European Union under the Seventh Framework Programme.

Funders
Spanish Agency for International Development Cooperation

Criticism 
According to NGO Monitor, the ARIJ has an anti-Israel policy that includes support for BDS.

References

External links
 ARIJ website
 POICA website
 Sustainable Treatment and Valorization of Olive Mill Waste in Palestine 

Organizations based in the State of Palestine
Organizations established in 1990
1990 establishments in the Palestinian territories
Environmental organizations based in the State of Palestine
Sustainable agriculture